Alexander Russell Simpson (28 February 1905 — 10 November 1975) was a Scottish first-class cricketer and schoolmaster.

Simpson was born at Dunfermline in February 1905 and was educated at Dunfermline High School. A club cricketer for Dunfermline and Forfarshire, Simpson made his debut for Scotland in first-class cricket against the touring South Africans at Glasgow in 1924. He played first-class cricket for Scotland until 1934, making twelve appearances. Playing as a wicket-keeper in the Scottish side, Simpson scored 101 runs at an average of 6.31, with a highest score of 19 not out; as wicket-keeper, he took 14 catches and made 10 stumpings. Outside of cricket, Simpson was a schoolmaster. He died in England at Weston-super-Mare in November 1975.

References

External links
 

1905 births
1975 deaths
Cricketers from Dunfermline
People educated at Dunfermline High School
Scottish cricketers
Scottish schoolteachers